Benson is a village in Woodford County, Illinois, United States. The population was 423 at the 2010 census, up from 408 in 2000. It is part of the Peoria, Illinois Metropolitan Statistical Area.

The village was established in 1874 with the construction of the Chicago, Pekin and Southwestern Railroad.  The town was named after S.H. Benson of Streator, Illinois, the railroad's general freight manager.  A post office was established in 1873.

The Benson Water Tower was replaced with a modern water tower in the 1980s and has since been demolished.

Geography

Demographics

As of the census of 2000, there were 408 people, 172 households, and 117 families residing in the village. The racial makeup of the village was 99.26% White, 0.25% Asian, and 0.49% from two or more races. Hispanic or Latino of any race were 0.25% of the population.

There were 172 households, out of which 27.3% had children under the age of 18 living with them, 61.0% were married couples living together, 6.4% had a female householder with no husband present, and 31.4% were non-families. 27.9% of all households were made up of individuals, and 17.4% had someone living alone who was 65 years of age or older. The average household size was 2.37 and the average family size was 2.92.

In the village, the population was spread out, with 24.3% under the age of 18, 7.4% from 18 to 24, 26.0% from 25 to 44, 16.9% from 45 to 64, and 25.5% who were 65 years of age or older. The median age was 40 years. For every 100 females, there were 98.1 males. For every 100 females age 18 and over, there were 91.9 males.

The median income for a household in the village was $40,500, and the median income for a family was $55,536. Males had a median income of $37,031 versus $21,161 for females. The per capita income for the village was $19,358. About 5.0% of families and 4.1% of the population were below the poverty line, including none of those under age 18 and 9.8% of those age 65 or over.

References

Villages in Illinois
Villages in Woodford County, Illinois
Peoria metropolitan area, Illinois